Peter Baumann (born 1960 in Rosenheim) is a German computer scientist and professor at Jacobs University, Bremen, Germany, where he is head of the Large-Scale Scientific Information Systems research group in the Department of Computer Science and Electrical Engineering.

Academic positions

Baumann is professor of Computer Science at Jacobs University, Bremen, Germany and founder and CEO of rasdaman GmbH.

He is inventor and Principal Architect of the rasdaman Array DBMS, the historically first complete implementation of what today is called a "Big Data Analytics" server for large, multi-dimensional arrays.
He has authored and co-authored 100+ book chapters and papers on array (aka raster) databases and further fields, and has given tutorials on raster databases worldwide.

Baumann is active in many bodies concerned with scientific data access:
 member, Open Geospatial Consortium (OGC); functions:
 chair, Coverages Domain Working Group
 chair, Web Coverage Service Standards Working Group (WCS.SWG)
 chair, Web Coverage Processing Service (WCPS) Working Group (this group has been merged into the WCS.SWG)
 editor of the specifications making up the OGC Web Coverage Service (WCS) standards suite
 founding member and secretary, CODATA Germany
 member, advisory board, GDI-HB (geo data infrastructure for Bremen)
 member, Commission for the Management and Application of Geoscience Information, a Commission of the International Union of Geological Sciences
 representative of Jacobs University Bremen in Kompetenzzentrum Geoinformatik Niedersachsen
 Part time Professor of Databases and Web Services in Jacobs University Bremen

Academic career

Baumann obtained a degree in Computer Science (1987) from Technical University of Munich, a doctorate (1993) in computer Science from the Department of Computer Science of the Technische Universität Darmstadt while working with Fraunhofer Institute for Computer Graphics.
He has pursued post-doctoral activities in both industry and academia,
working for Softlab Group in Munich (now Cirquent)
and as Assistant Head of the Knowledge Bases Research Group of FORWISS (Bavarian Research Center for Knowledge-based Systems) / Technical University of Munich where he was deputy to Prof. Rudolf Bayer, Ph.D.
Among Dr. Peter Baumann's entrepreneurial activities was founding of the spin-off company rasdaman GmbH for commercialization of the world's first multi-dimensional array database system.
In August 2004 he was appointed as Professor of Computer Science at Jacobs University Bremen (formerly: International University Bremen).

Awards and patents

(source: Peter Baumann's homepage)

 Copernicus Masters Competition 2014: Winner, Big Data Challenge
 Open Geospatial Consortium Kenneth Gardels Award 2014
 Geospatial World Forum Innovation Award 2013
 Innovationspreis Mittelstand 2012, category: Best of Open Source
 European IT Prize 1998
 Jos Schepens Memorial Award 1998
 Innovation Prize of the Bavarian State Government 1998
 Founders Competition Multimedia 1998, German Association of Engineers / Electrical Engineering - IT

Baumann holds international patents on array databases.

Research interests

Baumann's current research interests include scalable database and Web service support for large, multi-dimensional arrays, including algebraic modeling, query language, query optimization, system architecture, and applications such as earth sciences and life sciences. As part of this research, standardization of geo raster services is being addressed. As such, it is related to dimensional databases, however with a distinct focus on spatio-temporal, multi-dimensional raster graphics data, rather than business data.

Much of his concrete work is implemented and benchmarked in the framework of the rasdaman array DBMS.

Bibliography

See for a complete bibliography
 Peter Baumann Web Coverage Processing Service Implementation Specification version 1.0.0, OGC Best Practice Paper, doc no. 07-157.
 Peter Baumann Large-Scale Raster Services: A Case for Databases, Invited keynote, 3rd Intl Workshop on Conceptual Modeling for Geographic Information Systems (CoMoGIS), Tucson, USA, 6–9 November 2006. In: John Roddick et al. (eds): Advances in Conceptual Modeling - Theory and Practice, 2006, pp. 75 – 84.
 Peter Baumann A Database Array Algebra for Spatio-Temporal Data and Beyond, 4th International Workshop on Next Generation Information Technologies and Systems (NGITS '99), July 5–7, 1999, Zikhron Yaakov, Israel, Lecture Notes on Computer Science 1649, Springer Verlag, pp. 76 – 93.
 Peter Baumann On the Management of Multidimensional Discrete Data, VLDB Journal 4(3)1994, Special Issue on Spatial Database Systems, pp. 401–444.

References

External links
 Homepage

1960 births
Living people
German computer scientists
Academic staff of Jacobs University Bremen
People from Rosenheim
Technical University of Munich alumni
Technische Universität Darmstadt alumni